The Office of the Colorado State Public Defender provides legal assistance to individuals charged with a crime in Colorado state court who are financially unable to retain private counsel. The office consists of 21 regional trial offices, a centralized appellate office that handles appeals from every jurisdiction, and a centralized state administrative office.

History
In 1963, after Gideon v. Wainwright, the Colorado General Assembly passed the Colorado Defender Act. This Act authorized Colorado counties to either establish a public defender's office or remain under the previous ad hoc system of appointing counsel for indigent citizens accused of criminal offenses. Four county public defender offices were established under the Act: Denver, Brighton, Pueblo and Durango. In 1970, the State Legislature passed Senate Bill 126, which created the Office of the State Public Defender as an independent state agency.

Initially, the Colorado Supreme Court appointed the Colorado State Public Defender. Rollie R. Rogers was the first State Public Defender. He served from October 1969 through February 1978. On August 1, 1982, David F. Vela was appointed State Public Defender. He fulfilled the responsibilities of the office for more than 17 years, until his retirement on December 31, 1999. David S. Kaplan became the State Public Defender and served from January 1, 2000 until October 31, 2006. Upon his resignation, Douglas K. Wilson was appointed the 6th State Public Defender, effective November 1, 2006. After Douglas Wilson's retirement in July 2018, Megan A. Ring was appointed the 7th State Public Defender, and currently heads the organization. Ms. Ring is the first female appointed to the position.

Offices
The Public Defender has offices throughout Colorado: Alamosa, Arapahoe, Boulder, Brighton, Colorado Springs, Denver, Dillon, Douglas, Durango, Fort Collins, Glenwood Springs, Golden, Grand Junction, Greeley, La Junta, Montrose, Pueblo, Salida, Steamboat Springs, Sterling, and Trinidad.

Notable defenders and alumni
 Robert E. Allen
 Michael L. Bender
 John L. Kane Jr.
 Claire Levy
 Larry Pozner
 Nancy E. Rice
 Nicholas Sarwark

References

External links
 Official website

State agencies of Colorado
Legal aid in the United States
Criminal defense organizations
Public defense institutions